Hurdcott House is a 19th-century country house in Winterbourne Earls, Wiltshire, England, in the Bourne valley about  north-east of Salisbury. It became a Grade II listed building on 29 May 1987.

The two-storey house with three bays dates to the early-mid 19th century, and features Flemish brickwork with a slate roof, and a Tuscan doorcase. At the base of the rear wings of the house are four-flue brick stacks.

Hurdcott House, Barford St Martin 
This house, which is not a listed building, was rebuilt in the 1970s.

The entomologist John Henry Leech had his home at Hurdcott House, and died there in 1900. It is not clear which Hurdcott House this was.

References

Country houses in Wiltshire
Grade II listed buildings in Wiltshire
Grade II listed houses